Oxalis tenuifolia, also known by its common name thinleaf sorrel, is a species from the genus Oxalis. The plant was first described by Christian Friedrich Ecklon and Karl Ludwig Philipp Zeyher.

References

tenuifolia